Gogi Yemzariyevich Shoniya (born 6 February 1997) is a Russian former football player.

Club career
He made his debut in the Russian Professional Football League for FC Dynamo Bryansk on 4 August 2016 in a game against FC Saturn Ramenskoye.

References

External links
 Profile by Russian Professional Football League
 
 

1997 births
Footballers from Moscow
Russian sportspeople of Georgian descent
Living people
Russian footballers
Association football midfielders
Russian expatriate footballers
Expatriate footballers in Belarus
FC Dynamo Bryansk players
FC Granit Mikashevichi players